Lithuania competed at the 2015 World Aquatics Championships in Kazan, Russia from 24 July to 9 August 2015.

Medalists

Diving

Lithuanian divers qualified for the individual spots and the synchronized teams at the Worlds through the National Championships.

Women

Swimming

Lithuanian swimmers have achieved qualifying standards in the following events (up to a maximum of 2 swimmers in each event at the A-standard entry time, and 1 at the B-standard):

Eight Lithuanian swimmers (six men and two women) have been selected to compete at the World Championships, including defending Olympic champion and world record holder Rūta Meilutytė.

Men

Women

References

External links
Lithuanian Swimming Federation 

Nations at the 2015 World Aquatics Championships
2015 in Lithuanian sport
Lithuania at the World Aquatics Championships